This article summarizes the highlights of professional and amateur golf in the year 2006.

Men's professional golf
Major championships
 6–9 April: The Masters - Winner: Phil Mickelson The Augusta National course was lengthened to 7,445 yards for the tournament, generating some advance controversy. For the first time since 1954 neither Jack Nicklaus nor Arnold Palmer played. Vijay Singh shot 67 to take the first-round lead, but on Day 2 Chad Campbell moved to six under and a three-shot lead. Due to bad weather the third round wasn't completed until Sunday. After 54 holes Phil Mickelson led by one at 4 under and fifteen players were within four shots of the lead, including the top five in the world rankings (in ranking order Tiger Woods, Vijay Singh, Retief Goosen, Mickelson and Ernie Els). On Sunday Mickelson led for much of the day and finished two ahead of South African Tim Clark. It was Mickelson's third major championship, his second Masters title in three years and his second consecutive major victory as he also won the 2005 PGA Championship.

 15–18 June: U.S. Open - Winner: Geoff Ogilvy 15-year-old Tadd Fujikawa of Hawaii became the youngest qualifier in US Open history. Qualifier Madalitso Muthiya was the first Zambian to play in the U.S. Open. The tournament was played at Winged Foot for the first time since 1984. Scottish veteran Colin Montgomerie was the only man to shoot under par in round 1. After 36 holes Steve Stricker was one shot ahead of the field and the only man under par. Tiger Woods missed the first cut in a major of his professional career after posting a 12 over par total. Phil Mickelson shared the third-round lead with the 27-year-old Englishman Kenneth Ferrie, who was playing in his first U.S. Open. Mickelson led by one shot after 71 holes, but was unable to put it away on number 72.  His errant driving, which had troubled him all round, climaxed in a very poor tee shot that was almost out-of-bounds.  This was followed by several bad shot selections, leading to a double bogey 6, and a second-place finish to winner Geoff Ogilvy. First-round leader Colin Montgomerie finished T2 when he, needing only a par at hole number 72 to win, double bogeyed. This was Montgomerie's fifth second-place finish in a major championship and his third at the U.S. Open.
 20–23 July: The Open Championship - Winner: Tiger Woods The Open returned to Hoylake for the first time since 1967. Marius Thorp of Norway won the Silver Medal as leading amateur. Northern Ireland's Graeme McDowell took a one  shot lead on the first day. On Day 2, Tiger Woods moved into the lead early in the day and remained at the top of the leaderboard at the close, one shot ahead of Ernie Els. During the third round the top of the field bunched up, with several leading players moving into contention, but Woods regained a one stroke lead at the end of the day, over Chris DiMarco, Sergio García, and Ernie Els. Woods shot a 67 in the final round to win by two shots over DiMarco at 270, 18-under par, only one shot short of his own to-par record for all majors. It was his third Open Championship, eleventh major, and he became the first man to pass $60 million in PGA Tour career earnings.
 17–20 August: PGA Championship - Winner: Tiger Woods The tournament was played at Medinah Country Club near Chicago, which had been extended to 7,561 yards, making it the longest course in major championship history. The event was closely contested for three rounds, with a ten-way tie at one point early in round 3, but Tiger Woods pulled clear on the fourth day to win by five shots over Shaun Micheel. It was Woods' third PGA Championship win and his twelfth major championship title. Woods also became the first player ever to win the PGA twice on the same course, and the first in the era of the modern Grand Slam to win two major championships in each of two successive years. 

World Golf Championships (individual events)
 22–26 February: WGC-Accenture Match Play Championship - Australian World Number 53 Geoff Ogilvy defeated Davis Love III 3 and 2.
 24–27 August: WGC-Bridgestone Invitational - Tiger Woods beat Stewart Cink on the fourth hole of a sudden death playoff.
 28 September - 1 October: WGC-American Express Championship - Tiger Woods cruised to an 8 stroke victory to win his sixth straight strokeplay tournament and claim this championship for the fifth time in its seven stagings.

Other leading PGA Tour events
 23–26 March: The Players Championship - Stephen Ames of Trinidad and Tobago / Canada won by a record-equaling six stroke margin over World Number 3 Retief Goosen, becoming the second-oldest champion in Championship history (tying Hal Sutton).
 2–5 November: The Tour Championship - Twenty-six-year-old Adam Scott won this event for the first time in his career.

For a complete list of PGA Tour results see 2006 PGA Tour.

Other leading European Tour events
 25–28 May: BMW Championship  - Englishman David Howell won by five shots and moved into the top ten in the World Rankings for the first time.
 14–17 September: HSBC World Match Play Championship - Englishman Paul Casey beat American Shaun Micheel by 10 and 8 in the most one sided final in the history of the tournament.
 26–29 October: Volvo Masters - Jeev Milkha Singh becomes first Indian winner but attention is focused on Pádraig Harrington leapfrogging Paul Casey to win the Order of Merit, thanks to a missed putt on the final hole by Sergio García elevating Harrington to a tie for second place.

For a complete list of European Tour results see 2006 European Tour.

Tour money list and order of merit winners
 PGA Tour - Tiger Woods topped the money list with winnings of $9,941,563, despite playing only 15 events due to the death of his father mid-year. This was his seventh money list victory, putting him one behind Jack Nicklaus's record. Final money list
 European Tour - Pádraig Harrington topped the Order of Merit for the first time, with earnings of €2,489,337 Final Order of Merit
 Japan Golf Tour - Shingo Katayama topped the money list for the third consecutive year with earnings of ¥178,402,190. Final money list
 Asian Tour - Jeev Milkha Singh topped the Order of Merit for the first time with earnings of US$591,884 Final order of merit
 PGA Tour of Australasia - Nick O'Hern topped the Order of Merit for the first time, with earnings of A$583,820 Final order of merit
 Sunshine Tour - Charl Schwartzel of South Africa topped the 2005-06 Order of Merit with earnings of R1,207,459.70, and led the rankings for a third consecutive season in 2006-07 with earnings of R1,585,117.41. Final 2006-07 Order of Merit.

Awards
 PGA Tour
 Player of the Year (Jack Nicklaus Trophy) - Tiger Woods won for a record eighth time in ten full seasons on the PGA Tour
 Money winner (Arnold Palmer Award) - Tiger Woods won for the seventh time
 Vardon Trophy - Jim Furyk won for the first time with an adjusted scoring average of 68.86
 Byron Nelson Award - Tiger Woods won for a record seventh time with an adjusted scoring average of 68.11
 Rookie of the year - Trevor Immelman won the Western Open
 Comeback Player of the Year - Steve Stricker posted seven top-10 finishes
 Champions Tour
 Player of the Year - Jay Haas also topped the senior money list
 Rookie of the Year - Eduardo Romero
 Comeback Player of the Year - Tim Simpson
 Nationwide Tour
 Player of the Year - Ken Duke
 European Tour
 Player of the Year - Paul Casey
 Rookie of the Year - Marc Warren
Team events
 22–24 September: Ryder Cup - the Ryder Cup was played in Ireland for the first time. Europe were in the lead from the first set of matches. The Europeans went into the last day with a 10–6 lead and extended it to 18½ to 9½ in the singles, matching their best ever result in 2004. This was the first time Europe had won the matches three times in a row.
 7–10 December: WGC-World Cup - The event was held in Barbados for the first time, and Germany, represented by Bernhard Langer and Marcel Siem, beat Scotland in a play-off to win the tournament for the second time.

Other tour results
 2006 Asian Tour
 2006 PGA Tour of Australasia
 2006 Challenge Tour
 2006 Nationwide Tour

Other happenings
 11 January: The PGA Tour announced new six-year network deals with CBS and NBC to commence in 2007, and a fifteen-year deal with the Golf Channel.
 26 May: Frenchman Adrien Mörk shot the first 59 in the history of any of the PGA European Tour's three tours in the second round of the Challenge Tour's Moroccan Classic. 
 28 June: The PGA Tour announced further details of the FedEx Cup playoff system to be introduced in 2007, including confirmation that there will be a US$35 million-dollar bonus prize fund, with US$10 million going to the winner.
 29 October: Jeev Milkha Singh (Volvo Masters) and K. J. Choi (Chrysler Championship) became the first pair of Asian players to win on the PGA Tour and the European Tour in the same weekend.

Women's professional golf
LPGA majors
30 March - 2 April: Kraft Nabisco Championship: Australia's Karrie Webb defeated 18, 36 and 54 hole leader Lorena Ochoa in a playoff to claim her seventh major championship. Ochoa shot a 62 in the first round, setting a tournament record and equalling the record low score in an LPGA major.
8–11 June: LPGA Championship - Se Ri Pak defeated Karrie Webb in a playoff to claim her third LPGA Championship and fifth major title. Nicole Castrale shot a 64 in the first round to set a tournament record.
29 June - 2 July: U.S. Women Opened  - The tournament was played at Newport Country Club. The prize fund was US$3.1 million, a record for a women's golf tournament, with $560,000 going to the winner. The first day's play was cancelled due to fog and 36 holes were played on the Sunday. Annika Sörenstam and Pat Hurst tied on level par after 72 holes. Sörenstam won an eighteen-hole Monday playoff to claim her tenth major championship and third U.S. Open.
3–6 August: Weetabix Women's British Open - The tournament was played at Royal Lytham & St. Annes for the third time in its history.  American Sherri Steinhauer took the lead after a third round 66 and held the lead in the final round for a three-stroke win over runners-up Cristie Kerr and Sophie Gustafson. It was Steinhauer's third British Open win, but her first since the tournament became a major in 2001.

Ladies European Tour major (in addition to the Women's British Open)
26–29 July: Evian Masters - Karrie Webb continued her return to form by winning the second richest event in women's golf.

For a complete list of Ladies European Tour results see 2006 Ladies European Tour.

Additional LPGA Tour events 
6–9 July: HSBC Women's World Match Play Championship - 20-year-old American Brittany Lincicome beat veteran Juli Inkster 3 & 2 to claim her first LPGA Tour title.
16–19 November: LPGA Playoffs at The ADT - Julieta Granada from Paraguay claimed her first tour victory and the first US$1 million prize in women's golf.

For a complete list of LPGA Tour results see 2006 LPGA Tour.

Money list winners
LPGA Tour - 25-year-old Lorena Ochoa became the first Mexican to top the money list with earnings of $2,592,872. Current money list
Ladies European Tour - Laura Davies of England topped the money list of the seventh time in her career with earnings of €471,727.42. Final money list.

Team events
20–22 January: Women's World Cup - Sweden's Annika Sörenstam and Liselotte Neumann claimed the trophy in its second year.
15–17 December: 2006 Lexus Cup - Asia captained by South Korea's Grace Park defeated the International team captained by Sweden's Annika Sörenstam 12.5 to 11.5.

Other happenings
21 February: the first official Women's World Golf Rankings were published. Annika Sörenstam was ranked number 1.
4–7 May: Michelle Wie made the cut at the SK Telecom Open on the Asian Tour. This was the highest ranking men's tour on which a woman has made a cut since Babe Zaharias did so on the PGA Tour in 1945.
15–18 June: The first ever Futures Tour major event was played, the Michelob ULTRA Duramed FUTURES Players Championship. Canadian Salimah Mussani won with a 16-under par 272.
14 September: Annika Sörenstam became the first woman to pass $20 million in LPGA Tour career earnings.<ref>Sörenstam Crosses 20 Million Dollars in Career Earnings, lpga.com, September 14, 2006</ref>
12 November: With her victory at The Mitchell Company Tournament of Champions, Lorena Ochoa claimed the LPGA Rolex Player of the Year award.

Senior men's professional golf
Senior majors
25–28 May: Senior PGA Championship - Jay Haas won a playoff against Brad Bryant to claim his first senior major.
6–9 July: U.S. Senior Open - Defending champion Allen Doyle finished two shots ahead of Tom Watson.
13–16 July: Senior Players Championship - Bobby Wadkins won his first senior major
27–30 July: Senior British Open - Loren Roberts defeated Eduardo Romero at the first hole of a playoff to claim his first senior major.
24–27 August: The Tradition - Argentinian Eduardo Romero defeated Lonnie Nielsen in a playoff for his first Champions Tour title.

For a complete list of Champions Tour results see 2006 Champions Tour.
For a complete list of European Seniors Tour results see 2006 European Seniors Tour.

Money list winners
Champions Tour - Jay Haas topped the money list for the first time with earnings of US$2,420,227 - Final money list
European Seniors Tour - Sam Torrance topped the Order of Merit for the second consecutive year with earnings of €347,525 Final Order of Merit list

Amateur golf
May 31 - June 3: NCAA Division I Men's Golf Championships - Oklahoma State won the team event and Jonathan Moore of Oklahoma State was the leading individual
19–24 June: The Amateur Championship was won by 20-year-old Frenchman Julien Guerrier.
29–30 July: Curtis Cup - the USA defeated Great Britain & Ireland by 11.5 points to 6.5 points.
7–13 August: U.S. Women's Amateur - 14-year-old American Kimberly Kim of Hawaii became the youngest winner in the history of the event.
23–27 August: U.S. Amateur - Richie Ramsay became the first Scottish winner since Findlay Douglas in 1898 and the first British winner since Harold Hilton in 1911.
18–21 October: Espirito Santo Trophy (Women's Amateur World Team Championship) - South Africa won the tournament for the first time. They were the first home winners since 1980.
26–29 October: Eisenhower Trophy (Men's Amateur World Team Championship) - the Netherlands won for the first time.

Table of results
This table summarises all the results referred to above in date order.

The following biennial events will next be played in 2007: Presidents Cup; Seve Trophy; Solheim Cup; Walker Cup.

Miscellaneous
The first golf drive in space was made on 22 November 2006 funded by Canadian golf company Element 21'' as part of the Expedition 14.

References

 
Golf by year